Myosotis is a genus of flowering plants in the family Boraginaceae. The name comes from the Ancient Greek  "mouse's ear", which the foliage is thought to resemble. In the northern hemisphere they are colloquially known as forget-me-nots or scorpion grasses. Myosotis alpestris is the official flower of Alaska and Dalsland, Sweden. Plants of the genus are commonly confused with Chatham Islands' forget-me-nots, which belong to the related genus Myosotidium.

Description
The genus was originally described by Carl Linnaeus. The type species is Myosotis scorpioides. Myosotis species are annual or perennial herbaceous flowering plants with pentamerous actinomorphic flowers with 5 sepals and petals. Flowers are typically 1 cm in diameter or less, flatly faced, coloured blue, pink, white or yellow with yellow centres and borne on scorpioid cymes. The foliage is alternate, and their roots are generally diffuse.  They typically flower in spring or soon after the melting of snow in alpine ecosystems. 

The seeds are contained in small, tulip-shaped pods along the stem to the flower. The pods attach to clothing when brushed against and eventually fall off, leaving the small seed within the pod to germinate elsewhere. Seeds can be collected by placing a sheet of paper under stems and shaking the seed pods onto the paper.

Myosotis scorpioides is colloquially called scorpion grass because of the spiraling curvature of its inflorescence.

Distribution
The genus is largely restricted to western Eurasia, with approximately 60 confirmed species, and New Zealand with approximately 40 endemic species. A few species occur elsewhere including North America, South America, and Papua New Guinea. Despite this, Myosotis species are now common throughout temperate latitudes because of the introduction of cultivars and alien species. Many are popular in horticulture. They prefer moist habitats. In locales where they are not native, they frequently escape to wetlands and riverbanks. Only those native to the Northern hemisphere are colloquially denominated "forget-me-nots".

One or two European species, especially Myosotis sylvatica, the "woodland" forget-me-nots, have been introduced into most of the temperate regions of Europe, Asia, and the Americas.

Genetic analysis indicates that the genus originated in the northern hemisphere, and that species native to New Zealand, Australia, New Guinea and South America form a lineage of closely related species that are likely derived from a single dispersal event to the southern hemisphere.

Ecology

Myosotis are food for the larvae of some Lepidoptera species including the setaceous Hebrew character. Many of the species in New Zealand are threatened.<ref>{{Cite journal|author-link=Carlos Adolfo Lehnebach|last=Lehnebach|first=Carlos A.|date=21 August 2012|title=Two new species of forget-me-nots (Myosotis, Boraginaceae) from New Zealand|journal=PhytoKeys|issue=16|pages=53–64|doi=10.3897/phytokeys.16.3602|pmc=3492931|pmid=23233811}}</ref>

Taxonomy
Of more than 510 recorded species names, only 152 species are presently accepted, listed below. The remainder are either synonyms or hybrids of presently accepted or proposed names. Myosotis abyssinica Boiss. & Reut.Myosotis afropalustris  C.H. WrightMyosotis albicans  RiedlMyosotis albiflora Banks & Sol. ex Hook.f.Myosotis albosericea Hook.f.Myosotis alpestris F.W.Schmidt (alpine forget-me-not)Myosotis amabilis CheesemanMyosotis ambigens (Bég.) GrauMyosotis angustata CheesemanMyosotis anomala  RiedlMyosotis antarctica Hook.f.Myosotis arnoldii L.B.MooreMyosotis arvensis (L.) Hill (field forget-me-not)Myosotis asiatica (Vestergr. ex Hultén) Schischk. & Serg. (Asiatic forget-me-not)Myosotis atlantica  Vestergr.Myosotis australis R.Br.Myosotis austrosibirica  O.D.Nikif.Myosotis azorica H.C.Watson (Azores forget-me-not)Myosotis baicalensis  O.D.Nikif.Myosotis balbisiana Jord.Myosotis bothriospermoides Kitag.Myosotis brachypoda  Gren.Myosotis brevis de Lange & BarklaMyosotis brockiei L.B.Moore & M.J.A.SimpsonMyosotis bryonoma Meudt, Prebble & ThorsenMyosotis butorinae  StepanovMyosotis cadmea  KitagMyosotis cameroonensis  Cheek & R.BeckerMyosotis capitata  Hook.f.Myosotis chaffeyorum LehnebachMyosotis chakassica  O.D.Nikif.Myosotis cheesemanii PetrieMyosotis × cinerascens PetrieMyosotis colensoi (Kirk) J.F.Macbr.Myosotis concinna CheesemanMyosotis congesta  Shuttlew.Myosotis corsicana  (Fiori) GrauMyosotis czekanowskii (Trautv.) Kamelin & V.N.Tikhom.Myosotis daralaghezica  T.N.PopovaMyosotis debilis  PomelMyosotis decumbens HostMyosotis diminuta  GrauMyosotis discolor Pers. (changing forget-me-not)Myosotis densiflora C. KochMyosotis dissitiflora  BakerMyosotis ergakensis  StepanovMyosotis exarrhena F.Muell.Myosotis eximia PetrieMyosotis explanata CheesemanMyosotis forsteri Lehm.Myosotis gallica  Vestergr.Myosotis galpinii  C.H.WrightMyosotis glabrescens L.B.MooreMyosotis glauca (G.Simpson & J.S.Thomson) de Lange & BarklaMyosotis goyenii PetrieMyosotis graminifolia  DC.Myosotis graui  SelviMyosotis guneri  A.P.Khokhr.Myosotis heteropoda  Trautv.Myosotis hikuwai Meudt, Prebble & G.M.RogersMyosotis imitata  Serg.Myosotis incrassata Guss.Myosotis jenissejensis  O.D.Nikif.Myosotis jordanovii  N.Andreev & PeevMyosotis kamelinii  O.D.Nikif.Myosotis kazakhstanica  O.D.Nikif.Myosotis kebeshensis  StepanovMyosotis keniensis  T.C.E.Fr.Myosotis koelzii  RiedlMyosotis kolakovskyi  A.P.Khokhr.Myosotis krasnoborovii  O.D.Nikif. & Lomon.Myosotis krylovii Serg.Myosotis kurdica  RiedlMyosotis laeta CheesemanMyosotis laingii CheesemanMyosotis latifolia Poir. (broadleaf forget-me-not)Myosotis laxa Lehm. (tufted forget-me-not or bay forget-me-not)Myosotis lazica  PopovMyosotis lithospermifolia Hornem.Myosotis lithuanica  (Schmalh.) Besser ex Dobrocz.Myosotis litoralis  Steven ex M.Bieb.Myosotis ludomilae  Zaver.Myosotis lyallii Hook.f.Myosotis macrantha (Hook.f.) Benth. & Hook.f.Myosotis macrosiphon  Font Quer & MaireMyosotis macrosperma Engelm. (largeseed forget-me-not)Myosotis magniflora  A.P.Khokhr.Myosotis margaritae  ŠtěpánkováMyosotis maritima  Hochst. ex Seub.Myosotis martini  SennenMyosotis matthewsii L.B.MooreMyosotis michaelae  ŠtěpánkováMyosotis micrantha  Pall. ex Lehm.Myosotis minutiflora Boiss. & Reut.Myosotis monroi Cheeseman (Monro's forget-me-not)Myosotis nemorosa BesserMyosotis nikiforovae  StepanovMyosotis ochotensis  O.D.Nikif.Myosotis olympica  Boiss.Myosotis oreophila PetrieMyosotis pansa (L.B.Moore) Meudt, Prebble, R.J.Stanley & Thorsen Myosotis paucipilosa  (Grau) Ristow & HandMyosotis persoonii  Georges RouyRouy & E.G.CamusMyosotis petiolata Hook.f.Myosotis platyphylla Boiss.Myosotis popovii  Dobrocz.Myosotis pottsiana (L.B.Moore) Meudt, Prebble, R.J.Stanley & ThorsenMyosotis propinqua  (Turcz.) Fisch. & C.A.Mey.Myosotis pulvinaris Hook.f.Myosotis pusilla  Loisel.Myosotis radix-palaris  A.P.Khokhr.Myosotis ramosissima Rochel (early forget-me-not)Myosotis rakiura L.B.MooreMyosotis refracta  Boiss.Myosotis rehsteineri  (Hausm.) Wartm. ex Reut.Myosotis retrorsa Meudt, Prebble & Hindmarsh-WallsMyosotis rivularis (Vestergr.) A.P. KhokhrMyosotis robusta  D.DonMyosotis sajanensis  O.D.Nikif.Myosotis saxatilis PetrieMyosotis saxosa Hook.f.Myosotis schistosa  A.P.Khokhr.Myosotis schmakovii  O.D.Nikif.Myosotis scorpioides (L.) (true forget-me-not)Myosotis secunda Al.Murray (creeping forget-me-not)Myosotis semiamplexicaulis DC.Myosotis sicula Guss. (Jersey forget-me-not)Myosotis solange  Greuter & ZaffranMyosotis soleirolii  Godr.Myosotis sparsiflora J.C.Mikan ex PohlMyosotis spatulata G.Forst.Myosotis speciosa  Auguste PomelPomelMyosotis speluncicola Schott ex BoissMyosotis stenophylla KnafMyosotis stolonifera(J.Gay ex DC.) J.Gay ex Leresche & Levier
Myosotis stricta Link ex Roem. & Schult.
Myosotis suavis Petrie
Myosotis subcordata  Riedl
Myosotis sylvatica Ehrh. ex Hoffm. (wood forget-me-not)
Myosotis tenericaulis Petrie
Myosotis taverae  Valdés
Myosotis tineoi  C.Brullo & Brullo
Myosotis traillii  Kirk
Myosotis traversii Hook.f.
Myosotis tuxeniana  (O.Bolòs & Vigo) O.Bolòs & Vigo
Myosotis ucrainica  Czern.
Myosotis ultramafica Meudt, Prebble & Rance
Myosotis umbrosa Meudt, Prebble & Thorsen
Myosotis uniflora Hook.f.
Myosotis urceolaris  Shuttlew.
Myosotis venosa Colenso
Myosotis venticola Meudt & Prebble
Myosotis verna Nutt. (spring forget-me-not)
Myosotis vestergrenii  Stroh
Myosotis welwitschii Boiss. & Reut.
Myosotis wumengensis  L.Wei

Gallery

Symbolism
The small blue forget-me-not flower was first used by the Grand Lodge Zur Sonne, in 1926, as a Masonic emblem at the annual convention in Bremen, Germany. In 1938, a forget-me-not badge—made by the same factory as the Masonic badge—was chosen for the annual Nazi Party Winterhilfswerk, the annual charity drive of the National Socialist People's Welfare, the welfare branch of the Nazi party. This coincidence enabled Freemasons to wear the forget-me-not badge as a secret sign of membership.

After World War II, the forget-me-not flower was used again as a Masonic emblem in 1948 at the first Annual Convention of the United Grand Lodges of Germany. The badge is now worn in the coat lapel by Freemasons around the world to remember all who suffered in the name of Freemasonry, especially those during the Nazi era.

The flower is also used as a symbol of remembrance by the people of Newfoundland and Labrador. It is used to commemorate those from the province who were killed in the First World War, and worn around July 1.

It is also used in Germany to commemorate the fallen soldiers of the world wars in a similar manner to the use of remembrance poppies in the UK.

The flower is also the symbol for the Armenian Genocide's 100th anniversary. The design of the flower is a black dot symbolising the past, and the suffering of Armenian people. The light purple appendages symbolise the present, and unity of Armenians. The 5 purple petals symbolise the future, and the five continents Armenians escaped to. The yellow in the centre symbolises eternity, and the Tsitsernakaberd itself symbolises the 12 provinces lost to Turkey.

In Lithuania the flower has become one of the symbols for the commemoration of the January Events of 1991.

In The Netherlands, the forget-me-not has become a symbol for Alzheimer Nederland, a foundation advocating for people suffering from dementia.

In New Zealand, the Forget-Me-Not is the symbol for Alzheimers New Zealand, the foundation advocating for people suffering from Alzheimer's Disease and dementia.

In history of art, the forget-me-not is used to remember loved ones who have died. It is therefore very common in funerary portraits.

References

 
Boraginaceae genera
Symbols of Alaska
Taxa named by Carl Linnaeus
Blue flowers